Jamar Rolando McNaughton (born 10 October 1992), popularly known as Chronixx, is a Jamaican reggae artist. His stage name replaced the name "Little Chronicle" which he was given because of his father, the singer "Chronicle". Chronixx and his music has been branded as a "Reggae Revival", alongside other reggae musicians including Alborosie, Dre Island, Jah Bouks, Jah9, Protoje, Kelissa, Jesse Royal, Keznamdi and Kabaka Pyramid. His lyrical content revolves around themes of anti-war, romantic declarations and resiliency.

Early life

McNaughton wrote his first song, "Rice Grain", at the age of 5. During an interview with Okay Player Chronixx spoke on his early life:
"My music come from early beginnings, from childhood days. I used to sing at school, in church, and then my whole family sings. My daddy, Chronicle, caused me to be very exposed to music from a very tender age. That’s where the music started for me. Professionally now, that’s when I was in high school. I started producing. Making riddims. But the music go from then until now. When I was 15, 16 I started producing and it was a great vibe for me."
He attended St Catherine High School in Spanish Town. He started his recording career at the age of 11, recording a Gospel track with producer Danny Browne (which was not released), and went on to provide harmony vocals for artists such as Lutan Fyah as well as beginning production work, composing rhythms used by artists such as Konshens, Popcaan, and Munga Hornourebel for Mavrick Records. At the age of 14, he began producing and building riddims, including the Freezer riddim for Ice Box Records. In 2009 Chronixx's brother died which led to him writing with Romaine 'Teflon' Arnett of Zincfence Records.

Career
Chronixx popularity grew throughout 2012, with significant airplay in Jamaica, and performances at festivals such as Reggae Sumfest and a show in December at the Tracks and Records nightclub/restaurant in Kingston, which was attended by Usain Bolt. He was featured on the Major Lazer-curated mixtape Start a Fire.
In 2013, he had hits with "Smile Jamaica" and "Here Comes Trouble", and he toured the United Kingdom (including a BBC 1Xtra concert in Leeds) and the United States with his Zincfence Redemption Band. In March 2013, he travelled to Kenya, where he has a large fanbase, as a Peace Ambassador during the country's general election, and performed at the Tuko Rada Peace Concert in Nairobi. He again performed at Sumfest in 2013, in front of an audience of more than 10,000.

His EP, Dread & Terrible, was released on 1 April 2014, and topped the Billboard Top Reggae Albums charts on the week of 18 April. Following his appearance on the Jimmy Fallon show and his Central Park concert, the EP saw significant gains, according to Nielsen SoundScan, earning a number two position on the Digital Reggae Singles chart. The EP returned to the number one spot on the Top Reggae Albums chart, according to SoundScan. By March 2015, the EP had spent 42 consecutive weeks in the top 10 of the Top Reggae Albums chart.

In February 2014 Chronixx was featured on Protoje single "Who Knows", the lead single of the album Ancient Future. The single was later certified Silver by BPI in 2022.

In May 2014, he won Culture Artist of the Year, Best New Artist, and Entertainer of the Year at the Linkage Awards in New York. In July 2014, he performed on The Tonight Show Starring Jimmy Fallon on US network NBC. He followed this with a concert in Central Park attended by over 5,000 people. In September 2014, he was nominated for a MOBO Award in the Best Reggae Act category. The following month he won awards for Best Song (for "Smile Jamaica") and Best Music Video (for "Here Comes Trouble") at the 33rd International Reggae & World Music Awards. He founded his own ZincFence Recordz production house along with producer Romain "Teflon" Arnett and co-producer/engineer Ricardo "Shadyz" Lynch. As well as Chronixx, ZincFence has produced hits by Jah Cure, Kabaka Pyramid, and Protoje, and had worked with Maverick Sabre, Mavado, and Nomaddz.

In January 2015, Chronixx appeared on "Belly of the Beast" a song which featured on American rapper Joey Badass debut album B4.Da.$$.
In June 2015, Chronixx performed at the Glastonbury Festival.

His 2017 debut album, Chronology, received a Grammy Award nomination, and in the same year he received a Prime Minister's National Youth Award for Excellence.

On 13 March 2020, Chronixx released the first single "Dela Move" from his upcoming second album, "Dela Splash". The title of the track and album were inspired by his hometown – De La Vega City, a district in Spanish Town, Jamaica.

Discography

Albums

Mixtapes
Start a Fire (2012) - with Major Lazer and Walshy Fire
Roots & Chalice (2016) - with Federation Sound, Soul Circle Music

EPs

Singles
"Somewhere" (2012)
"Start a Fyah" (2012)
"Mi Alright" (2013)
"Access Granted" (2013)
"Alpha and Omega" (2013)
"Most I" (2013)
"Thanks and Praise" (2013)
"Here Comes Trouble" (2013)
"Selassie Souljahz" (2013)
"Smile Jamaica" (2013)
"Ain't No Giving In" (2013)
"Rain Music" (2013)
"Perfect Tree" (2014)
"Prayer" (2014)
"Play Some Roots" (2015)
"Capture Land" (2015)
"Ghetto People" (2015)
"Light It Up" (2015)
"Majesty" (2017)
"Likes" (2017)
"Skankin Sweet" (2017)
"Ghetto Paradise" (2017)
"Spanish Town Rockin" (2017)
"Sweet love" (2017) 
"Eternal Light" (2019)
"Dela Move" (2020)
"Same Prayer" (feat. Kabaka Pyramid) (2020)
"Cool As The Breeze/Friday" (2020)
"Safe N Sound" (2021)
"Freedom Fighter" (2021)
"Never Give Up" (2022)

References

External links

1992 births
21st-century Jamaican male  singers
Jamaican reggae singers
Jamaican Rastafarians
Living people